Evanílson Aparecido Ferreira (born 12 September 1975), known simply as Evanílson, is a Brazilian former professional footballer.

A player of wide range who spent most of his career with Borussia Dortmund, he could play as either a right back or midfielder.

Club career
Born in Diamantina, Minas Gerais, Evanílson started his senior career with América Futebol Clube (MG), joining Cruzeiro Esporte Clube for the 1999 season. On 16 August of that year he left the Belo Horizonte club and signed with Borussia Dortmund, making his Bundesliga debut 13 days later and being sent off in a 1–0 away win against SSV Ulm 1846.

Evanílson's contractual situation was somewhat complex: in 2001, his compatriot Márcio Amoroso moved from Parma A.C. to Dortmund for €25 million. In return, Evanílson was sold in the opposite direction for €17.5 million, for accounting reasons; Dortmund then received Evanílson on loan, only paying "beer money" for this move and, in 2003, a contractual clause was triggered which forced Dortmund to buy him back for €15 million.

During four seasons, Evanílson made an efficient wingback partnership at the German club with another Brazilian, Dedé – arrived one season before him – as the Black Yellows won the 2002 national championship with 27 games and one goal from the player, also reaching the season's UEFA Cup final (nine appearances, seven complete). In his final two years, however, he appeared rarely due to several injuries, namely a serious cruciate ligament one, and returned in late April 2005 to his country, joining Clube Atlético Mineiro on a two-year contract, which was prematurely terminated due to lack of salary payments, with the subsequent court action.

On 17 January 2006, Evanílson's returned to Germany and signed a five-month contract with 1. FC Köln, appearing in only one complete game in a relegation-ending season, the 1–0 loss at Hannover 96 on 18 March. He closed out his professional career at the age of 35, after playing rarely for four different clubs in Brazil, his last being his first América de Minas Gerais.

International career
Evanílson gained 13 caps for Brazil in one year, playing in two games at the 1999 Copa América as Cafu's backup, with the national team winning the tournament in Paraguay.

Additionally, he was selected for two FIFA Confederation Cups: in the 1999 edition, he appeared in four games - including the 8–2 semifinal routing of Saudi Arabia – as the Seleção finished in second position.

Honours

Club
América-MG
Campeonato Brasileiro Série B: 1997

Borussia Dortmund
Bundesliga: 2001–02
UEFA Cup: Runner-up 2001–02
DFB-Ligapokal: Runner-up 2003

Sport Club do Recife
Campeonato Pernambucano: 2007

International
Brazil
Copa América: 1999
FIFA Confederations Cup: Runner-up 1999

References

External links

1975 births
Living people
Brazilian footballers
Association football defenders
Association football midfielders
Brazil international footballers
1999 Copa América players
1999 FIFA Confederations Cup players
2001 FIFA Confederations Cup players
Copa América-winning players
Campeonato Brasileiro Série A players
América Futebol Clube (MG) players
Clube Atlético Mineiro players
Cruzeiro Esporte Clube players
Club Athletico Paranaense players
Sport Club do Recife players
Esporte Clube Vitória players
Timbaúba Futebol Clube players
Bundesliga players
Borussia Dortmund players
1. FC Köln players
Botafogo Futebol Clube (PB) players
Independente Futebol Clube players
Brazilian expatriate footballers
Brazilian expatriate sportspeople in Germany
Expatriate footballers in Germany